Alison Maillard (born 5 August 1998) is a Chilean diver. In 2019, she finished in 27th place in the preliminary round in the women's 1 metre springboard event at the 2019 World Aquatics Championships held in Gwangju, South Korea. In the women's 3 metre springboard event she finished in 45th place in the preliminary round. Maillard and Donato Neglia finished in 17th place in the mixed synchronized 3 metre springboard event.

In 2019, she finished in 6th place in the women's 1 metre springboard at the 2019 Pan American Games held in Lima, Peru. In the women's 3 metre springboard event she finished in 10th place.

References 

Living people
1998 births
Place of birth missing (living people)
Chilean female divers
Divers at the 2019 Pan American Games
Pan American Games competitors for Chile
21st-century Chilean women